Ampara is the main town of Ampara District, governed by an Urban Council. 

History
This was a hunters' resting place during British colonial days (late 1890s and early 1900). During the development of the Gal Oya scheme from 1949 by the Prime Minister D. S. Senanayake, Ampara was transformed into a town. Initially it was the residence for the construction workers of Inginiyagala Dam. Later it became the main administrative town of the Gal Oya Valley.

References

 
Towns in Ampara District
Ampara DS Division